Claude D'Espence was a French theologian and diplomat, born in 1511 at Châlons-sur-Marne; died 5 Oct., 1571, at Paris. He entered the Collège de Navarre in 1536, and later became the rector of the Sorbonne before he got his doctorate.  He was involved with the Council of Trent and argued against the Protestant apologist Theodore Beza about the value of tradition.

References

1511 births
1571 deaths
University of Paris alumni
16th-century French Catholic theologians
Participants in the Council of Trent
Rectors of the University of Paris